Loligo forbesii (sometimes erroneously spelled forbesi), known commonly as the veined squid and long-finned squid, is a commercially important species of squid in the family Loliginidae, the pencil squids.

Description
The long fins are roughly diamond-shaped and make up two thirds of the total length of the body. The colour of the squid is variable, but is usually a shade of pink, red, or brown. The vestigial shell is a small, thin internal structure.

Distribution
Loligo forbesii can be found in the seas around Europe, its range extending through the Red Sea toward the East African coast. It is widespread in the Atlantic Ocean. It is one of the most common cephalopods in the Celtic Sea.

Biology
It attains sexual maturity at about one year old and lives 1 to 2 years, with a maximum life span of about 3 years. It generally breeds only once. The male delivers sperm into the mantle of the female using structures on a specialized tentacle. The female will spawn up to 100,000 eggs, which adhere to the sea floor. Peak spawning season is in January through March off Scotland, with recruitment of juveniles occurring in the fall. Off Galicia the breeding season lasts from December to May, with most mating occurring in December through February.

The diet includes fish, polychaetes, crustaceans, and other cephalopods, often members of its own species.

Fisheries
This is one of the most common squid species fished in the United Kingdom.

References

External links

Squid
Cephalopods described in 1856
Marine molluscs of Europe
Cephalopods of Europe

da:Tiarmet blæksprutte